Víctor Hugo Ortega Serna (born January 27, 1988 in Medellín, Antioquia) is a male diver from Colombia, who competed in the 2008 Olympic Games of Beijing for his native country. He and his team mate Juan Urán finished in 6th position in the 10 m synchronized platform event.  He competed again at the 2012 Summer Olympics, in the individual 10 m platform event.  At the 2016 Olympics, he again competed in the 10 m platform event.

References

1988 births
Living people
Colombian male divers
Divers at the 2007 Pan American Games
Divers at the 2008 Summer Olympics
Divers at the 2011 Pan American Games
Divers at the 2012 Summer Olympics
Divers at the 2016 Summer Olympics
Olympic divers of Colombia
Sportspeople from Medellín
Pan American Games medalists in diving
Pan American Games silver medalists for Colombia
Pan American Games bronze medalists for Colombia
Divers at the 2015 Pan American Games
South American Games bronze medalists for Colombia
South American Games medalists in diving
Competitors at the 2014 South American Games
Divers at the 2019 Pan American Games
Medalists at the 2015 Pan American Games
21st-century Colombian people